Euchaetes albicosta is a moth of the family Erebidae. It was described by Francis Walker in 1855. It is found from Texas, south to Mexico and Nicaragua.

References

 Arctiidae genus list at Butterflies and Moths of the World of the Natural History Museum

Phaegopterina
Moths described in 1855